Denmark Township is one of the twenty-seven townships of Ashtabula County, Ohio, United States. The 2010 census found 946 people in the township.

Geography
Located in the eastern part of the county, it borders the following townships:
Sheffield Township - north
Monroe Township - northeast corner
Pierpont Township - east
Richmond Township - southeast corner
Dorset Township - south
Lenox Township - southwest corner
Jefferson Township - west
Plymouth Township - northwest corner

No municipalities are located in Denmark Township.

Name and history
It is the only Denmark Township statewide.

The area now composing Denmark Township was long inhabited by the Seneca Indian tribe. Peter Knapp, a New Yorker who arrived in 1809, was the first Euro-American settler in the area.

Denmark Township was described in 1833 as having one gristmill and two saw mills.

Government

The township is governed by a three-member board of trustees, who are elected in November of odd-numbered years to a four-year term beginning on the following January 1. Two are elected in the year after the presidential election and one is elected in the year before it. There is also an elected township fiscal officer, who serves a four-year term beginning on April 1 of the year after the election, which is held in November of the year before the presidential election. Vacancies in the fiscal officership or on the board of trustees are filled by the remaining trustees.  Currently, the board is composed of chairman Charles Frye and members Chad Corron and Fred Williams.

References

External links
County website

Townships in Ashtabula County, Ohio
Populated places established in 1798
Townships in Ohio